Year 159 (CLIX) was a common year starting on Sunday (link will display the full calendar) of the Julian calendar. At the time in Roman territories, it was known as the Year of the Consulship of Quintillus and Priscus (or, less frequently, year 912 Ab urbe condita). The denomination 159 for this year has been used since the early medieval period, when the Anno Domini calendar era became the prevalent method in Europe for naming years.

Events

By place

India 
 In India, the reign of Shivashri Satakarni, as King Satavahana of Andhra, begins.

Births 
 December 30 – Lady Bian, wife of Cao Cao (d. 230)
 Annia Aurelia Fadilla, daughter of Marcus Aurelius
 Gordian I, Roman emperor (d. 238)
 Lu Zhi, Chinese general (d. 192)

Deaths 
 Liang Ji, Chinese general and regent
 Liang Nüying, Chinese empress

References